The 1960 pre-Olympic basketball tournament was the final qualifying tournament for basketball at the 1960 Summer Olympics at Rome, and was held at the Palazzo dello Sport in Bologna on August 13–20. Teams were divided into two pools, with both pools having distinct preliminary and final rounds; the preliminary round in every pool was divided into two groups with either 4 or 5 teams. The top two teams per group advanced to the final round. The best two from each final round qualified directly for the Olympic Games, and the fifth spot was decided between the third best of both groups in a final match.

First pool

Preliminary round

Group A

Group B

Final round
Results from Canada–Spain and Czechoslovakia–Belgium were carried over.

Second pool

Preliminary round

Group C

Group D

Final round
Results from Hungary-Yugoslavia and Poland-Israel were carried over.

5th-8th Place

5th place match
The winner earned the final spot in the 1960 Olympic Summer Games.

7th place match

Final standings

First pool

Second pool

References

FIBA archive

Qual
1960
Basketball
International basketball competitions hosted by Italy
Sport in Bologna